Microecology means microbial ecology or ecology of a microhabitat. Human gut microecology is the study of the microbial ecology of the human gut (Walden et al, 2021).This includes the composition of the gut microbiota, its metabolic activity, and the interactions between the microbiota, the host, and the environment. Research in human gut microecology is important because the microbiome can have profound effects on human health. The microbiome is known to influence the immune system, digestion, and metabolism, and is thought to play a role in a variety of diseases, including diabetes, obesity, inflammatory bowel disease, and cancer. Studying the microbiome can help us better understand these diseases and develop treatments.

Microecology is a large field that includes many topics such as; evolution, biodiversity, exobiology, ecology, bioremediation, recycling, and food microbiology (Martin and McMinn, 2018). It is the study of the interactions between living organisms and their environment, and how these interactions affect the organisms and their environment. Additionally, it is a multidisciplinary area of study, combining elements of biology, chemistry, physics, and mathematics. It focuses on the study of the interactions between microorganisms and the environment they inhabit, their effects on the environment, and their effects on other organisms. Microecology also studies the effects of human activity on the environment and how this affects the growth and development of microorganisms. Microecology has many applications in the fields of medicine, agriculture, and biotechnology. It is also important for understanding the cycling of nutrients in the environment, and the behavior of microorganisms in various environments.  

Moving onwards Intestinal microecology is a new area of microecology study. It is a complex microflora that is directly related to human health (Jin et al, 2019). Therefore, regulation of intestinal microecology will help in the treatment of many diseases. It was reported that intestinal flora is involved in anti-tumor immunotherapy and affects the curative effect of anti-malignant tumor therapy to varying degrees. 

The activity of metabolites and microbial composition of the intestinal microbiota are associated with various diseases including gastrointestinal diseases and cancer. Similar to the intestinal microecosystem, the vaginal microecosystem is also complicated and plays an important role in women's health. Maintaining microecological balance and the acidic environment of the vagina inhibits the proliferation of pathogenic bacteria.

References

Microbiology
Subfields of ecology